David Lucas is the name of:

Sports
 David Lucas (cricketer) (born 1978), English cricketer
 David Lucas (footballer) (born 1977), English footballer
 David Lucas (handballer), Australian handballer; see 2004 Pacific Handball Cup
 Dave Lucas (ice hockey) (born 1932), Canadian ice hockey player

Others
 David Lucas (composer) (born 1937), American rock and roll producer and jingle writer
 David Lucas (engraver) (1802–1881), English mezzotint engraver
 David Lucas (politician) (born 1950), state senator from Georgia (U.S. state)
 Dave Lucas (poet) (born 1980), American poet and essayist
 Steve Blum (born 1960), American voice actor who has been credited by this name